John Saxon Crakanthorp (12 November 1901 – 4 April 1983) was a rugby union player who represented Australia.

Crakanthorp, a fullback, was born in a suburb of Sydney and claimed 1 international rugby cap for Australia.

References

1901 births
1983 deaths
People from Bathurst, New South Wales
Australian rugby union players
Australia international rugby union players
Rugby union players from New South Wales
Rugby union fullbacks